Edward Dupré Atkinson (2 February 1855, d. 26 April 1937) was Archdeacon of Dromore from 1905 to 1933.

Harding was born in Dublin and educated at Rugby and Caius.  He was called to the bar at Lincoln's Inn in 1878. He was ordained in 1881 and his first post was a curacy  at Seapatrick.  He was rector of Donaghcloney from 1884 to 1919; and vicar of Kilbroney from 1919 to 1931.

Published works

Notes

Further reading
Alumni Cantabrigienses: A Biographical List of All Known Students, Graduates and Holders of Office at the University of Cambridge, from the Earliest Times to 1900, John Venn/John Archibald Venn Cambridge University Press  > (10 volumes 1922 to 1953) Part II. 1752-1900 Vol. i. Abbey – Challis, 1940) p92

Christian clergy from Dublin (city)
People educated at Rugby School
Gonville and Caius College, Cambridge
Archdeacons of Dromore
19th-century Irish Anglican priests
20th-century Irish Anglican priests
1855 births
1937 deaths
English barristers